Tottenham Hotspur Superleague Formula team was the racing team of Tottenham Hotspur F.C., a football team that competes in England in the Premier League. The Tottenham Hotspur F.C. racing team competed in the Superleague Formula. It was operated in 2008 by GTA Motor Competición and was operated by Alan Docking Racing during the 2009 and 2010 season.

2008 season
In the 2008 Superleague Formula season Tottenham finished 11th overall in the standings.  The Tottenham driver was Duncan Tappy in all rounds except the 2008 Estoril Superleague Formula round where Dominik Jackson was driving. The team's best placing was 2nd in the 2nd race of the 2008 Zolder Superleague Formula round.

2009 season
In the 2009 Superleague Formula season Craig Dolby was confirmed as the driver and Alan Docking Racing would now operate the team.

Dolby drove for the Anderlecht team the previous year.

Record
(key)

2008

2009
Super Final results in 2009 did not count for points towards the main championship.

2010

References

External links
 Tottenham Hotspur Superleague Formula team minisite
 Official Tottenham Hotspur football club website

Tottenham Hotspur F.C.
Superleague Formula club teams
2008 establishments in England